The 2010 Sukma Games, officially known as the 13th Sukma Games, was a Malaysian multi-sport event held in Malacca from 12 to 19 June 2010. Host Malaccan swimmer J. Karthik and Federal Territorian swimmer Chan Kah Yan were announced as Best Sportsman and Best Sportswoman of the event respectively.

Development and preparation

Venues 

The 13th Sukma Games had 29 venues for the games. 23 in Melaka Tengah, 4 in Alor Gajah and 2 in Jasin.

Marketing

Logo

The logo of the 2010 Sukma Games is an image of a mousedeer, the state animal of Malacca. The colours of Red, Yellow, Blue and White represents Malacca, the host state of the games. The mousedeer's jumping movement represents the athletes activeness and fitness. The red and blue lines that forms the shape of the mousedeer represents the confidence of the organiser in hosting the games and the rousing atmosphere of the games. Overall, the logo's triangular pattern of the logo represents the dynamic movement of the athletes and their aspirations in reaching excellence.

Mascot
The mascot of the 2010 Sukma Games is a chevrotain (or mousedeer) named Tuah, which was named after the warrior, Hang Tuah of the Malacca Sultanate. The mascot's name Tuah also means luck in Malay, which represents the luckiness of Malacca as the host of the 2010 Sukma Games. It is said the mousedeer is the state animal of Malacca, an extant species are found in forests in Southeast Asia. According to Malay folktale, it is an animal that eliminates Parameswara's hunting dog down the river of Malacca nearby the tree where he shed while just fled from Palembang, Srivijaya after the Srivijaya Kingdom's fall. The adoption of the mousedeer as the games' mascot is to relate its agility, bravery and the intelligence character to that of the athletes participating at the games.

The games

Participating states

  (546 athletes)
  (536 athletes)
  (284 athletes)
  (host) (662 athletes)
  (496 athletes)
  (500 athletes)
  (435 athletes)
   (601 athletes)
  (197 athletes)
   (510 athletes)
  (650 athletes)
  (638 athletes)
  (625 athletes)
  (629 athletes)
  (110 athletes)

Sports 

 Aquatic

Medal table

Related events

Paralimpiad Malaysia

The 15th Paralimpiad Malaysia was held in Malacca from 21 to 26 November.

References

External links
 2010 Sukma Games official website

Sukma
2010 in multi-sport events
Sport in Malacca
Sukma Games